The Society for Orthodontic Dental Technology is a professional body that represents orthodontic technicians and is based in Germany. Established in 1990, the society was founded by Friedbert Schmeil, who served as the society's first chairman until 1997.

Current activities
The aims of the association are to promote high quality of orthodontic dental technology, to stimulate and support interdisciplinary engagement, to hold an annual congress and build relationships with international professional organisations.

Membership
Although based in Germany with a predominantly German membership, GK has an international membership base – the society has members from Austria, France, Italy, Luxembourg, Norway, Poland, Spain, Sweden, Switzerland and the United Kingdom. Membership benefits include contact with colleagues and other professional organisations both national and internationally, a regularly updated membership register, new innovations at national and international level, opportunities for active participation in the society, an online encyclopaedia of orthodontic technology as well as regular updates about the society. As of 2014, membership is €60 per annum.

Board of directors
The society is run by a board of directors, currently chaired by Berit Junghanns. Heike Pietack is secretary and Gerhard Maier is treasurer. Petra Brambora, Jörg Stehr and Ines Forest are the other board members.

Annual congress
The GK holds an annual congress, and invites nationally and internationally renowned speakers to lecture at the event. The conference also offers members a platform to share their experiences and advice to colleagues. Home speakers have included Rolf Hinz, Aurelia Lerch and Ursula Wirtz. International speakers have included James Green, Paul Mallett and Guido Pedroli.

Partner organizations
GK has a close working relationship with overseas organizations such as GTO and ORTEC (Italy), Sveriges Ortondonti Tandtekniker Förening (Sweden) and the Orthodontic Technicians Association (United Kingdom).

External links
 GK Official Website

Dental organizations
Medical associations based in Germany
Organizations established in 1990
Orthodontic organizations
Medical and health organisations based in Saxony-Anhalt